Emilia Patricia Gómez Bravo (born 6 October 1954) is a Mexican politician affiliated with the Ecologist Green Party of Mexico. As of 2014 she served as Senator of the LVIII and LIX Legislatures of the Mexican Congress representing the Federal District.

References

1954 births
Living people
Politicians from Mexico City
Women members of the Senate of the Republic (Mexico)
Members of the Senate of the Republic (Mexico)
Ecologist Green Party of Mexico politicians
21st-century Mexican politicians
21st-century Mexican women politicians